Mathew Kevin Wright (born 3 March 1988) was a New Zealand rugby union who played 56 games for  in the National Provincial Championship between 2012 and 2020. He announced his retirement from rugby in late 2020.

He also previously played for RC Narbonne in the French Rugby Pro D2 competition.

References

External links
itsrugby.co.uk profile

1988 births
Living people
New Zealand rugby union players
Rugby union fullbacks
Northland rugby union players
Rugby union players from the Auckland Region